Iwambi is an administrative ward in the Mbeya Urban district of the Mbeya Region of Tanzania. In 2016 the Tanzania National Bureau of Statistics report there were 13,652 people in the ward, from 12,387 in 2012.

Neighborhoods 
The ward has 7 neighborhoods.
 Ilembo
 Ivwanga
 Kandete
 Lumbila
 Mayombo
 Ndeje
 Utulivu

References 

Wards of Mbeya Region